Cuitláhuac García Jiménez (born 18 April 1968) is a Mexican politician affiliated with the National Regeneration Movement (MORENA) who currently serves as Governor of Veracruz. Previously, he represented Veracruz as a federal deputy in the LXIII Legislature of the Mexican Congress.

Early life and education
García was born in the Veracruz state capital of Xalapa and received a degree in mechanical and electrical engineering from the Universidad Veracruzana in 1991, followed by master's degrees from the Instituto Politécnico Nacional and the University of Manchester. In 2004, he obtained a doctoral degree from the Hamburg University of Technology. García has taught at the Escuela Normal Superior Veracruzana Doctor Manuel Suárez Trujillo and the Universidad Veracruzana.

Political career 
García's first political experience was in the Mexican Socialist Party (PMS), where he became a follower of party leader Heberto Castillo. When the PMS was essentially replaced by the Party of the Democratic Revolution (PRD) in 1989, he remained with the party as a representative and national councilor. In 2013, he became one of MORENA's founding members.

In 2015, García successfully ran for the Chamber of Deputies for the LXIII Legislature from Veracruz's tenth district, covering voters in Xalapa. He initially served on the Justice Commission, an assignment he left when he took leave from the federal legislature in order to run for Governor of Veracruz in 2016. Competing alone for MORENA, García garnered 26.39 percent of the vote, finishing third behind candidates Héctor Yunes Landa and winner Miguel Ángel Yunes Linares. After the failed gubernatorial bid, García returned to the Chamber of Deputies with just one secretarial commission post, on the Navy Commission.

In order to align itself with the federal electoral calendar, Veracruz held gubernatorial elections again in 2018, with García running as the candidate for the Juntos Haremos Historia coalition, headlined by MORENA. The 2018 gubernatorial bid bore fruit, with exit polls on election night putting him ahead of Miguel Ángel Yunes Márquez, the son of Yunes Linares, and the other candidates in the race.

References

1968 births
Living people
Politicians from Veracruz
People from Xalapa
Members of the Chamber of Deputies (Mexico)
Morena (political party) politicians
21st-century Mexican politicians
Instituto Politécnico Nacional alumni
Alumni of the University of Manchester
Governors of Veracruz
Deputies of the LXIII Legislature of Mexico